The Dow Jones Global Titans 50 Index is a float-adjusted index of 50 of the largest (by market capitalization) and best known blue chip companies traded on the New York Stock Exchange, American Stock Exchange, Nasdaq, Euronext, London Stock Exchange, and Tokyo Stock Exchange. The index represents the biggest and most liquid stocks traded in individual countries. It was created by Dow Jones Indexes to reflect the globalization of international blue chip securities in the wake of mergers and the creation of megacorporations.

The DJ Global Titans 50 is part of the Dow Jones Global Titans Indexes that were created to reflect the globalization of international blue chip securities in the wake of mergers and the creation of mega-corporations. They are large cap companies with at least some of their operations outside of their domestic markets. Each index is constructed by selecting stocks from the corresponding benchmark indexes of the Dow Jones Global Indexes.

Dow Jones also offers the Dow Jones Sector Titans Indexes, which are global indexes covering large-cap stocks in sectors such as financial services, chemicals, industrial goods and services, energy, consumer goods, and noncyclical goods and services.

Statistics
As of July 19, 2019 the DJ Global Titans 50 had a total market capitalization valued at US$230,709.11 million and a total return of 15.23 percent over the last three years.

Composition
As of March 2022, there are 55 constituents that make up the DJGT, this is caused by certain companies, like Alphabet, having multiple constituents within the index.

See also

S&P Dow Jones Indices
Dow Jones Industrial Average
S&P Global 100
BBC Global 30

References

Global stock market indices
S&P Dow Jones Indices